John Gore (born 1962) is an eighteen-time Tony-winning and Emmy-nominated British entertainment producer, known for his live theatre company the John Gore Organization.

Early life and education 

Gore was educated at Harrow School and graduated in film and theatre from London University in 1987.  His student production of Joe Orton's What The Butler Saw enjoyed a successful professional run at the Bloomsbury Theatre. Gore's producing and/or directing credits on the West End include: Thunderbirds F.A.B. (produced first in 1989 is currently the most revived show in the history of the West End, returning for a sixth time in 2002); Star Trek – the Lost Voyage of the Enterprise; and Wallace & Gromit.

Career 

Gore founded Key Brand Entertainment (KBE) in 2004 to develop theatrical properties in the United States. Broadway Across America (BAA) was acquired in January 2008, from the music company Live Nation, while the e-commerce theatre website Broadway.com was acquired in December 2010, from Hollywood Media Corp. In 2016, KBE was rebranded as the John Gore Organization.

Gore has received 18 Tony Awards, an Olivier Award and 2 NY Emmy Award. Gore has been a member of the board of governors of The Broadway League since 2008.

In 2010 Gore was nominated for a Prime Time Emmy Award for Outstanding Non-Fiction Special for Believe: The Eddie Izzard Story. In 2018 Gore won a NY Emmy Award for At The Tonys with Imogen Lloyd Webber for WCBS-TV.

Gore also has extensive property interests in County Donegal, Ireland.

John Gore Organization 

The John Gore Organization (JGO), formerly known as Key Brand Entertainment (KBE), is a producer and distributor of live theater in North America, as well as an e-commerce company, focused on theater. KBE was founded in the UK in 2004 by Gore, who is the company's chairman, CEO and owner.

The company's assets include:

 Broadway Across America (BAA) a major theater touring organization in North America acquired in 2008. With over 400,000 season subscribers, BAA has earned 215 Tony Awards in over 30 years of producing and investing in Broadway shows. BAA owns and/or operates five theaters in Boston, Baltimore, and Minneapolis.
 Broadway.com, the e-commerce site, with the 2010 acquisition of Theatre Direct NY. Broadway.com has been cited as the number one source of information on Broadway based on the Broadway League Audience Demographic Survey In 2018, Broadway.com won a NY Emmy for its production of At The Tonys with Imogen Lloyd Webber for WCBS-TV.
 Group Sales Box Office, merged with Broadway.com/Groups in 2012.
 BroadwayBox.com, the top source for Broadway discounts was acquired in 2013.
 The Broadway Channel, the video content brand acquired in 2015.

Awards 
Theatre
As the John Gore Organization
 A Strange Loop - 2022 Tony Award for Best Musical
 The Lehman Trilogy - 2022 Tony Award for Best Revival Of A Musical
 Company - 2022 Tony Award for Best Revival Of A Musical; Drama Desk Award
 Moulin Rouge! The Musical – 2020 Tony Award for Best Musical
 Oklahoma! - 2019 Tony Award for Best Revival Of A Musical
 The Prom - 2019 Drama Desk Award for Outstanding Musical
 The Waverly Gallery - 2019 Drama Desk Award
 The Band's Visit - 2018 Tony Award for Best Musical
 Angels in America - 2018 Tony Award for Best Revival of a Play; Drama Desk Award
 Dear Evan Hansen - 2017 Tony Award for Best Musical
 Hello, Dolly! - 2017 Tony Award for Best Revival of a Musical; Drama Desk Award
 A View From The Bridge - 2016 Tony Award for Best Revival of a Play; Drama Desk Award

As Broadway Across America
 The Humans - 2016 Tony Award for Best Play; Drama Desk Award
 Pippin - 2013 Tony Award for Best Revival of a Musical; Drama Desk Award
 The Gershwins' Porgy and Bess - 2012 Tony Award for Best Revival of a Musical
 War Horse - 2011 Tony Award for Best Play; Drama Desk Award
 Memphis — 2010 Tony Award for Best New Musical; Drama Desk Award
 La Cage Aux Folles — 2010 Tony Award for Best Revival of a Musical; Drama Desk Award
 Hair — 2009 Tony Award for Best Revival of a Musical; Drama Desk Award
 Spring Awakening — 2009 Olivier Award for Best New Musical in London
 Passing Strange — 2009 Drama Desk Award for Best New Play
 Boeing-Boeing — 2008 Tony Award for Best Revival of a Play; Drama Desk Award

Television
As Broadway.com

 Broadway Profiles with Tamsen Fadal - 2021 NY Emmy Award for Best Magazine Series.

 At The Tonys with Imogen Lloyd Webber - 2018 NY Emmy Award for Special Event Coverage (Other than News and Sports)

Philanthropy 
Philanthropically, Gore has supported The Arthur Miller Foundation with a grant to provide theater educators in NYC Public Schools. In 2017, Gore raised $500,000 for Hurricane Maria relief in Puerto Rico by producing a benefit performance of Thornton Wilder's Our Town starring Scarlett Johansson, Robert Downey Jr. and Chris Evans. It was announced in September 2018 that JGO pledged $100,000 to the T. Fellowship at Columbia University, a program that fosters new creative producers.

Politics 
He is a regular and substantial contributor to the Conservative Party in the UK; in 2018 his donation of £1.6 million was the largest that the party received. During campaigning for the 2019 General Election, Gore again donated £1.5 million to the Conservative Party, topping the list of single-donations that the party received in this period.

Footnotes

External links 

Living people
People educated at Harrow School
Alumni of the University of London
1961 births
English theatre managers and producers
English chief executives
Conservative Party (UK) donors